Operation Lancer was a military operation by Dutch and Australian troops on Timor during World War II. Lancer Force was the name of Australian troops used to replace Sparrow Force.

Around 60 men from the KNIL were to be inserted onto Timor by the Australian navy to undertake guerrilla warfare against the Japanese. Australian ships were constantly attacked by Japanese planes and on 1 December 1942  was sunk with heavy loss of life; most of the survivors died.

References

External links
 AWM52 1/5/49 - Lancer Force

1942 in Portuguese Timor
Military operations involving the Netherlands
Military operations of World War II involving Australia